Marcus Westfält (born 12 March 2000) is a Swedish professional ice hockey forward who currently plays under contract to Färjestad BK of the Swedish Hockey League (SHL).

Playing career
Westfält first played as a youth with Vallentuna BK in the Hockeyettan before continuing his junior career with Brynäs IF. On 1 December 2017, he was signed to a four-year contract extension to continue his development with Brynäs IF.

He made his Swedish Hockey League debut in the 2017–18 season, appearing in a depth role over 31 games for 4 points. Westfält was drafted by the Philadelphia Flyers in the seventh round, 205th overall, in the 2018 NHL Entry Draft.

In the following 2018–19 season, Westfält posted an assist in 19 appearances in the SHL, before he was loaned to Karlskrona HK of the HockeyAllsvenskan for the remainder of the season on 3 January 2019. 

Westfält spent the entirety of the 2019–20 season, continuing in the Allsvenskan on loan from Brynäs IF with Västerviks IK. He registered three goals and 8 points in 52 games, opting to sign a new one-year contract with Västerviks IK by leaving Brynäs IF on 3 June 2020.

Following three seasons with Västerviks IK, Westfält made a return to the SHL for the 2022–23 season, signing a three-year contract with  Färjestad BK on 2 June 2022.

Career statistics

Regular season and playoffs

International

References

External links

2000 births
Living people
Brynäs IF players
Färjestad BK players
Karlskrona HK players
Philadelphia Flyers draft picks
Ice hockey people from Stockholm
Swedish ice hockey centres
Västerviks IK players